Prachuap Khiri Khan railway station is a railway station located in Prachuap Khiri Khan Subdistrict, Prachuap Khiri Khan City.

The station opened in June 1914, as part of the Wang Phong-Prachuap Khiri Khan Southern Line Section. In December the line continued on to Ban Krut Station.

Train services 
 Special Express 43/44 Bangkok-Surat Thani-Bangkok
 Special Express 37/38 Bangkok-Sungai Kolok-Bangkok
 Rapid 171/172 Bangkok-Sungai Kolok-Bangkok
 Rapid 169/170 Bangkok-Yala-Bangkok
 Rapid 173/174 Bangkok-Nakhon Si Thammarat-Bangkok
 Rapid 167/168 Bangkok-Kantang-Bangkok
 Express 85/86 Bangkok-Nakhon Si Thammarat-Bangkok
 Special Express 39/40 Bangkok-Surat Thani-Bangkok
 Special Express 41/42 Bangkok-Yala-Bangkok
 Ordinary 251/252 Bang Sue Junction-Prachuap Khiri Khan-Bang Sue Junction
 Ordinary 254/255 Lang Suan-Thon Buri-Lang Suan
 Rapid 177/178 Thon Buri-Lang Suan-Thon Buri

References 
 
 
 
 

Railway stations in Thailand